Coleophora calandrella is a moth of the family Coleophoridae that is endemic to Kazakhstan.

References

External links

cadella
Moths of Asia
Endemic fauna of Kazakhstan
Moths described in 1989